Kittisena was King of Anuradhapura in the 6th century, whose reign lasted the year 524. He succeeded his father Kumara Dhatusena as King of Anuradhapura. He was assassinated and succeeded by his uncle Siva II.

See also
 List of Sri Lankan monarchs
 History of Sri Lanka

References

External links
 Kings & Rulers of Sri Lanka
 Codrington's Short History of Ceylon

Monarchs of Anuradhapura
K
K
K